Jennica Haikarainen (born 1 August 1989) is a Finnish retired ice hockey player. She played her senior career in the Naisten SM-sarja with the Tampereen Ilves; in the Swedish Women's Hockey League (SDHL; called Riksserien until 2016) with Linköping HC, Modo Hockey, and HV71; and in the Division 1 with Sundsvall/Timrå and IF Björklöven. Haikarainen won a bronze medal with the Finnish national team at the 2015 IIHF Women's World Championship.

References

External links
 

1989 births
Living people
Finnish women's ice hockey forwards
Linköping HC Dam players
Ilves Naiset players
Modo Hockey Dam players
HV71 Dam players
Finnish ice hockey centres